Price Mashaw Cobbs, M.D. (November 2, 1928 – June 25, 2018) was a psychiatrist, civil rights leader, author and management consultant. He published extensively about racism and created a clinical model called Ethnotherapy. He was one of the founders of the African American Leadership Institute Anderson School of Business at UCLA and a Life Member of the NAACP. He co-authored two books with William Grier, Black Rage and The Jesus Bag and co-authored Cracking the Corporate Code with Judith L. Turnock.

He was born on November 2, 1928 in Los Angeles to Rosa Mashaw and Peter Price. His father was a physician. He received his B.A. from the University of California, Berkeley and his M.D. from Meharry Medical College. He was married to Evadne Priester and they lived in San Francisco. She died in 1973, leaving him and two children. He remarried with Frederica Maxwell Cobbs and lived in San Francisco until his death in 2018. He died in Philadelphia, where he had traveled for his grandson's high school graduation.

References 

American writers
American psychiatrists
1928 births
2018 deaths
University of California, Berkeley alumni
Meharry Medical College alumni
Members of the National Academy of Medicine